The Twin Peaks are a set of mountain high points located on the Alpine Ridge within the Wasatch Range in Utah, on the border between Salt Lake and Utah County. They are usually referred to as the American Fork Twin Peaks, to distinguish them from the nearby Broads Fork Twin Peaks and Avenues Twin Peaks. Consisting of several sub-peaks, only one has the prominence to be considered a true summit. The peak is also the most prominent in Salt Lake County, and one of the most prominent in the Wasatch Range.

Gallery

References 

Mountains of Utah
Mountains of Salt Lake County, Utah
Mountains of Utah County, Utah
Wasatch Range